Samrawit Fikru is an Ethiopian computer scientist, entrepreneur, and businesswoman who is the founder and CEO of Hybrid Designs, a software development company which produces the most popular ridesharing app in the country, RIDE.

Early life and education 

Fikru was born in Asella, Ethiopia. She received her diploma in software engineering from MicroLink Information Technology College in 2004. She graduated with a BSc in computer science from the HiLCoE School of Computer Science and Technology in 2006. Prior to coming to Addis Ababa when she was 17, she had never seen or used a computer.

Career 

Fikru founded the software development company Hybrid Designs in 2014. The same year, Hybrid Designs released RIDE as an SMS-based ridesharing service. It was relaunched as a mobile app with a backing call center in July 2017. RIDE was inspired by the difficulty Fikru experienced trying to hire a taxi cab after late nights at work. She also wanted to create a service to address the safety concerns felt by herself and others in trying to find a taxi, and developed RIDE to help address these gaps.

As of 2020, the app has tens of thousands of users and has been downloaded over 50,000 times. The development staff for the app is 90% female. Fikru aims to inspire other women with her work: "Women-owned business are growing in number; now we need more young girls to access the finances to make their creative ideas happen."

In 2022, Fikru released Sewasew, a streaming platform for Ethiopian music.

Honors and awards 

Fikru was recognized as one of the Rest of World's 100 Global Tech Changemakers
Fikru's success as a tech entrepreneur and her inspiration to young women were recognised by her inclusion on the BBC's 100 Women list in 2022.

References

External links 

 
 

21st-century Ethiopian women
21st-century women engineers
BBC 100 Women
Ethiopian chief executives
Ethiopian women in business
Ethiopian women computer scientists
Living people
Year of birth missing (living people)
Women chief executives
Women company founders